LY-344,545 is a research drug developed by the pharmaceutical company Eli Lilly, which acts as an antagonist for the metabotropic glutamate receptor subtype mGluR5. It is an epimer of another metabotropic glutamate receptor antagonist, the mGluR2/3-selective LY-341,495.

References 

Eli Lilly and Company brands
MGlu5 receptor antagonists
Xanthenes